Mohamed Seddik nicknamed Shahta (14 April 1940 – 5 July 1996) was an Egyptian footballer. He competed in the men's tournament at the 1964 Summer Olympics.

References

External links
 

1940 births
1996 deaths
Egyptian footballers
Egypt international footballers
Olympic footballers of Egypt
Footballers at the 1964 Summer Olympics
1962 African Cup of Nations players
Association footballers not categorized by position